Ken O'Halloran (born 7 August 1986 in Bishopstown, Cork, Ireland) is an Irish former sportsperson.  He plays Gaelic football and hurling with his local club Bishopstown and was a member of the Cork senior inter-county football team from 2010 till his retirement in 2017.

Career

Intercounty
He has played with Cork at all underage levels in both football and hurling. At minor level he won a Munster Hurling Championship in 2004 . At Under 21 football he won Munster Football Championships in 2005, 2006 & 2007, in 2007 he also won a Munster Hurling Championship as well as an All Ireland Football medal. He graduated to the Cork seniors where he won a Munster senior 2012, an All Ireland 2010 and three National Football Leagues (2010,11,12).

College
He started sigerson football from 2006-2011. He  started for the UCC team in the Sigerson Cup, he played in the 2010 final but was on the losing side. He was on the winning ucc side of 2011. he also received two sigerson all stars 1010/2011.

Club
At club level he has enjoyed success with Bishopstown. He won back to back Minor hurling Championships with the club in 2003 & 2004. He then did the same at Under 21 level in 2006 & 2007. He also won an Intermediate Hurling Championship with the club. He was on the losing side in 2012 county hurling final to Sarsfields.

School
He helped his school, Coláiste an Spioraid Naoimh from Bishopstown, to win the Corn Uí Mhuirí title in 2005, the first in the school's history. He scored the winning goal in the semi final and was man of the match in the final.

Honours

Bishopstown
Cork Intermediate Hurling Championship:
Winner (1): 2006
Cork Minor Hurling Championship:
Winner (2):2003, 2004
Cork Under-21 Hurling Championship:
Winner (2):2006, 2007

Cork
Football
All-Ireland Senior Football Championship:
Winner (1):
Munster Senior Football Championship:
Winner (1): 2012
Runner-up (1): 2011
National Football League (Div 1):
Winner (2): 2010 (sub), 2011, 2012 (sub)
All-Ireland Under-21 Football Championship:
Winner (1): 2007
Runner-up (1): 2006
Munster Under-21 Football Championship:
Winner (3): 2005, 2006, 2007
Munster Minor Football Championship:
Winner (0):
Runner-up (1): 2004

Hurling

Munster Minor Hurling Championship:
Winner (1): 2004
Munster Under-21 Hurling Championship:
Winner (2): 2005, 2007
Runner-up (1): 2006

Coláiste an Spioraid Naoimh
Corn Uí Mhuirí:
Winner (1): 2005

UCC
Sigerson Cup:
Winner (1): 2011Runner up (1):''' 2010

References

1986 births
Living people
Dual players
Bishopstown Gaelic footballers
Bishopstown hurlers
Cork inter-county Gaelic footballers
Gaelic football goalkeepers
Hurling goalkeepers
Irish schoolteachers